Down on the Farm is the seventh studio album by the American rock band Little Feat. The album was completed and released shortly after the death of the band's founder and frontman, Lowell George, in 1979. It was their last original work for nine years. The band had announced their break-up in June 1979 during the making of the album. Little Feat would reform in 1987.

The cover shows one of Neon Park's several duck-girls -
an allusion to "The Finishing Touch" by painter Gil Elvgren.

Track listing 

Side One
"Down on the Farm" (Paul Barrère) – 4:16 (lead singer: Paul Barrère)
"Six Feet of Snow" (Lowell George, Keith Godchaux) – 2:30 (lead singer: Lowell George)
"Perfect Imperfection" (Barrère, Tom Snow) – 3:46 (lead singer: Lowell George)
"Kokomo" (George) – 2:58 (lead singer: Lowell George)
"Be One Now" (George, Fred Tackett) – 4:05 (lead singer: Lowell George)

Side Two
"Straight from the Heart" (George, Payne) – 4:59 (lead singer: Lowell George)
"Front Page News" (George, Payne) – 5:57 (lead singer: Lowell George)
"Wake up Dreaming" (Payne, Fran Payne) – 4:09 (lead singer: Bill Payne)
"Feel the Groove" (Clayton, Gordon DeWitty) – 4:49 (lead singer: Sam Clayton)

Charts

Personnel

Band Members 

Paul Barrère - guitar, vocals
Sam Clayton - congas, vocals
Lowell George - guitar, vocals (last album with group)
Kenny Gradney - bass
Richie Hayward - drums, vocals
Bill Payne - keyboards, synthesizer, vocals

Additional personnel 

Rosemary Butler - backing vocals
Gordon DeWitty - keyboards
Robben Ford - guitar
Jerry Jumonville - saxophone
Sneaky Pete Kleinow - pedal steel guitar
David Lindley - guitar
Earl Palmer - drums ("Feel the Groove")
Fran Payne - backing vocals
Bonnie Raitt - backing vocals
Dan Smith - backing vocals
Fred Tackett - guitar (solo on "Kokomo")
Lee Thornburg - trumpet, trombone
Julia Waters - backing vocals
Luther Waters - backing vocals
Oren Waters - backing vocals
Maxine Willard Waters – backing vocals

References 

1979 albums
Little Feat albums
Warner Records albums
Albums produced by Lowell George
Albums with cover art by Neon Park
Albums recorded at Wally Heider Studios